Nahuel Sebastián Yaqué (born 18 March 1995) is an Argentine professional footballer who plays as a midfielder, most recently for Villa Dálmine.

Career
Yaqué was produced in Argentina by Almagro's youth system. In 2017, Yaqué moved to Spain after agreeing terms with Tercera División side San Pedro. Five appearances followed, which preceded the midfielder signing for Gavà - a fellow fourth tier team. He featured fourteen times for the Catalonia outfit until his departure on 17 January 2018. Yaqué then had a stint with Primera Catalana's Tortosa, where he made two appearances; against Sant Ildefons and Valls respectively. Later that year, on 29 June, Yaqué returned to his homeland with Villa Dálmine. He made his bow in a Primera B Nacional win over Olimpo on 8 December. He left the club at the end of the 2018-19 season.

Personal life
Yaqué is the son of former footballer Carlos Yaqué, who made one hundred appearances in the Argentine Primera División for three clubs as well as playing for teams in Colombia, Ecuador, Italy, Peru and Spain. His brother, Nicolás, is also a footballer - they played together for San Pedro, Gavà and Tortosa in Spanish football.

Career statistics
.

References

External links

1995 births
Living people
Yaqué family
People from Tres de Febrero Partido
Argentine footballers
Association football midfielders
Argentine expatriate footballers
Expatriate footballers in Spain
Argentine expatriate sportspeople in Spain
Tercera División players
Primera Catalana players
Primera Nacional players
UD San Pedro players
CF Gavà players
CD Tortosa players
Villa Dálmine footballers
Sportspeople from Buenos Aires Province